BMW Marine GmbH was BMW's marine engine division. BMW's interest in marine engines dated back to 1913; they began making marine engines in 1919 after World War I.

Gasoline engines
In the early 1970s, marinized versions of BMW's 2.0-litre, 4-cylinder gasoline engine were marketed as the Model 410 and 411. In 1977, BMW AG established a separate marine division,  incorporated as BMW Marine GmbH. BMW Marine's head office and assembly plant were located in Verviers, Belgium.

BMW Marine continued to marinize BMW's production automobile engines.  BMW's 2.0-litre, four-cylinder M10 engine became the B 130, and the M30 six-cylinder engines in 2.8 and 3.3-litre variations became the B 190 and B 220 models. Later, the larger 3.5-litre M30 with electronic ignition became the B 635. Model numbers related to the engine's horsepower.

Stern drives
BMW Marine, in conjunction with ZF, designed and manufactured a new stern drive unit. These stern drives were marketed as the BMW Z-Drive. Uniquely, these stern drives utilized a multiple wet clutch system. These drives competed with Sweden's Volvo Penta and Mercury Marine's Mercruiser Division of Stillwater, Oklahoma.

Diesel engines
To further compete with Volvo Penta, BMW added small diesel auxiliary sail boat engines, ranging from 7 to 50 horsepower, to the BMW Marine product lineup. The engines were based on four air-cooled diesel engines manufactured by Hatz, then marinized by BMW Marine. Hurth Marine transmissions and instrument panels were added, and the resulting marine systems were marketed as the D 7, D 12, D 35, and D 50 engines. The engines were among the first in the marketplace to offer balance shaft technology, which made for a smoother running engine. Later, BMW Marine modified the two larger models to reduce the corrosion damage caused by salt water cooling. The new models were renamed the D 35-2 and D 50-2. Many of these auxiliary engines found their way into both racing and cruising sailboats made by companies such as S2, Pearson, Jonmeri, and Hans Christian. Custom yacht builders, such as Lyman Morse in the USA, also installed BMW Marine engines in their boats.

BMW Marine conspicuously needed a large diesel, especially to compete in the European power boat market. The company sourced engines from VM Motori in Northern Italy. The VM HR.H 692 block became the basis for the next series of BMW Marine engines. Most gasoline and diesel internal combustion engines bolt the crankshaft onto the bottom of the crankcase. The Vm Motori engines were unusual, in that they incorporated the crankshaft inside the crankcase.  This type of construction, sometimes seen in racing car engines, is referred to as a "tunnel bore" block. It was also used in the Maybach MD870 diesel engine.

BMW Marine designed and manufactured thousands of special marine parts for the VM tunnel bore blocks. These turbocharged engines became BMW Marine's D 150 W and D 150 Z models, outputting 136 HP. A 165 HP turbocharged and intercooled D 190 was also available. The D 150 and D190 diesel engines were sold with either a Hurth 360 transmission for inboard installation or the BMW Z-Drive for stern drive applications. The D190 was later re-engineered, and with a modified Mark II Z-Drive, was sold as the BMW D 636 Z with 180 HP. Following this, a five-cylinder 3.0-litre version of the 3.6-litre six was offered as the BMW D 530. In England, Fairline and Plancraft offered their products with BMW Power. In America, Ken Hopen's GlasPly plant in Washington state featured both BMW gasoline and diesel engines with BMW Z-Drives in his product line.

Sale to Mercury Marine
With a downturn in the automotive market in 1987, and a lack of significant success in the recreational marine market, BMW decided to close the marine division. The Belgium plant and assets were sold to Mercury Marine of Fond du Lac, Wisconsin. BMW further signed a parts distribution agreement with Mercury to ensure the continued supply of parts to BMW Marine engine owners. Mercury continued production of the BMW five- and six-cylinder diesel engines. The BMW D 530 and D 636 became the Mercruiser 530 D-TA and 636 D-TA. Mercury later changed the designations to D183 and D219 TURBO AC. Mercury continued where BMW Marine had left off, improving on these VM based engines. In the early 1990s they offered a larger 4.2-litre diesel designated the D254 Turbo AC. The designation '254' related to the displacement of the engine in cubic inches. As of 2008, variations of the original 3.6-litre engines became the Mercruiser D4.2L/220 IDI six-cylinder diesel. Parts for BMW Marine engines continue to be available from Mercury Marine and their subsidiary, Marine Power, in Belgium. Some of the original 200 BMW Marine dealers worldwide continue to service and sell parts.

References

External links
BMW Blog, News & Reviews

BMW
Marine engine manufacturers
Manufacturing companies established in 1919